Atmosphere-breathing electric propulsion, or air-breathing electric propulsion, shortly ABEP, is a propulsion technology for spacecraft, which could allow thrust generation in low orbits without the need of on-board propellant, by using residual gases in the atmosphere as propellant. Atmosphere-breathing electric propulsion could make a new class of long-lived, low-orbiting missions feasible.

The concept is currently being investigated by the European Space Agency (ESA)  and the EU-funded DISCOVERER project. Current state-of-the-art conventional electric thrusters cannot maintain flight at low altitudes for any times longer than about 2 years, because of the limitation in propellant storage and in the amount of thrust generated, which force the spacecraft's orbit to decay. The ESA officially announced the first successful RAM-EP prototype on-ground demonstration in March 2018.

Principle of operation 

An ABEP is composed by an intake and an electric thruster: rarefied gases which are responsible for drag in low Earth orbit (LEO) and low and very low Earth orbit (VLEO), are used as the propellant. This technology would ideally allow S/Cs to orbit at very low altitudes (< 400 km around the Earth) without the need of on-board propellant, allowing longer time missions in a new section of atmosphere's altitudes. This advantage makes the technology of interest for scientific missions, military and civil surveillance services as well as low orbit even lower latecy communication services than Starlink. 

A special intake will be used to collect the gas molecules and direct them to the thruster. The molecules will then be ionized by the thruster and expelled from the acceleration stage at a very high velocity, generating thrust. The electric power needed can be provided by the same power subsystems developed for the actual electric propulsion systems, likely a combination of solar arrays and batteries, though other kind of electric power subsystems can be considered. An ABEP could extend the lifetime of satellites in LEO and VLEO by compensating the atmospheric drag during their time of operation. The altitude for an Earth-orbiting ABEP can be optimised between 120-250 km. This technology could also be utilized on any planet with atmosphere, if the thruster can process other propellants, and if the power source can provide the required power, e.g. sufficient solar irradiation for the solar panels, such as Mars and Venus, otherwise other electric power subsystems such as a space nuclear reactor or radioisotope thermoelectric generator (RTG) have to be implemented, for example for a mission around Titan.

Concepts and testing 

ESA's RAM-EP, designed and developed by SITAEL in Italy, was first tested in laboratory in May 2017.

The Institute of Space Systems at the University of Stuttgart is developing the intake and the thruster, the latter is the RF helicon-based Plasma Thruster (IPT) , which has been ignited for the first time in March 2020, see IRS Uni Stuttgart Press Release. Such a device has the main advantage of no components in direct contact with the plasma, this minimizes the performance degradation over time due to erosion from aggressive propellants, such as atomic oxygen in VLEO, and does not require a neutralizer. Intake and thruster are developed within the DISCOVERER EU H2020 Project.

Intakes have been designed in multiple studies, and are based on free molecular flow condition and on gas-surface interaction models: based on specular reflections properties of the intake materials, high efficiencies can theoretically be achieved by using telescope-like designs. With fully diffuse reflection properties, efficiencies are generally lower, but with a trapping mechanism the pressure distribution in front of the thruster can be enhanced as well.

Busek Co. Inc. in the U.S. patented their concept of an Air Breathing Hall Effect Thruster (ABHET) in 2004, and with funding from the NASA Institute for Advanced Concepts, started in 2011 a feasibility study that would be applied to Mars (Mars-ABHET or MABHET), where the system would breath and ionize atmospheric carbon dioxide. The MABHET concept is based on the same general principles as JAXA's Air Breathing Ion Engine (ABIE) or ESA's RAM-EP.

See also 

 Ion-propelled aircraft

References 

Ion engines